Melicope nukuhivensis is a species of plant in the family Rutaceae. It is endemic to French Polynesia.

References

nukuhivensis
Flora of French Polynesia
Near threatened flora of Oceania
Taxonomy articles created by Polbot
Plants described in 1935